Jean Charles Romatet (17 May 1896 - 15 May 1975) was a French military officer who served as a general in World War II. He began his career during World War I as a flying ace credited with seven aerial victories.

Biography

Jean Charles Romatet was born on 17 May 1894 in Borgo, Corsica.

Romatet began his military career during World War I in the French Army on 10 October 1912; after seasoning as a cavalryman, he entered military school as an Aspirant on 12 October 1913. On 5 August 1914, he was appointed as Sous lieutenant. He transferred to the French Air Force on 30 November 1916 as an aerial observer. On 15 January 1917, he was posted to Escadrille 38; on 30 April 1917, he was granted his observer's brevet.

A posting to pilot's training came next, starting 7 September 1917. On 8 November, he was awarded his Military Pilot's Brevet. After advanced training, he was posted to Escadrille Spa.76 as a fighter pilot on 22 February 1918. He was transferred to command Escadrille Spa.165. He became a flying ace credited with seven confirmed victories (4 victories with Escadrille Spa.76 and 3 victories with Escadrille Spa.165).

Romatet rose to the rank of General during World War II while commanding Groupe 23 at Laon-Chambly. He later served as Chief of Staff of the Vichy French Air Force from 1940 to 1942.

Jean Charles Romatet died on 15 May 1975.

Career Details

 1932 Lieutenant Colonel - Commanding Officer Air Forces, French West Africa
 1937 Became Temporary Commanding Officer 22nd Air Brigade and Director of Teaching, École de l'Air 
 1938 Attached to the Ministry of National Defence 
 1938 Second Deputy Chief of the Air Staff 
 1939 Promoted to Brigadier-General
 1940 First Deputy Chief of the Air Staff 
 1940-1942 Chief of the Air Staff - promoted to Major-General and later to Lieutenant General

Sources

References
 Franks, Norman; Bailey, Frank (1993). Over the Front: The Complete Record of the Fighter Aces and Units of the United States and French Air Services, 1914–1918. London, UK: Grub Street Publishing. .

1890s births
1975 deaths
French World War I flying aces
French Army officers
French Air Force generals
Chiefs of the Staff of the French Air and Space Force
French military personnel of World War II
Chevaliers of the Légion d'honneur
Recipients of the Croix de Guerre (France)